The Shastri Park metro station is located on the Red Line of the Delhi Metro.

Station layout

See also
List of Delhi Metro stations

References

Delhi Metro stations
Railway stations opened in 2002
2002 establishments in Delhi
Railway stations in North Delhi district
Memorials to Lal Bahadur Shastri

